Stabblandet is an island in Aure Municipality in Møre og Romsdal county, Norway. The  island lies to the west of the island of Ertvågsøya, south of the smaller island of Solskjelsøya, east of the large island of Tustna, and north of the mainland of Halsa Municipality.

In 2015, there were 121 residents living on the island. Most of the population lives on the northern part of the island.

See also
List of islands of Norway

References

Aure, Norway
Islands of Møre og Romsdal